Carlos Antonio Padilla Velásquez (17 January 1934 – 6 January 2014) was a Honduran footballer and manager who has the record of winning most titles as coach in the Honduran football league.

Managerial career
Nicknamed el Zorro, Padilla managed F.C. Motagua for a record 141 matches from 19 July 1970 to 18 May 1975 (1,764 days).

He is the only manager in Honduran league history to win titles with four different sides.

Titles
 1960 — Champion with Águila (SLV).
 1965–66 — Champion with Platense (HON).
 1970–71 — Champion with Motagua (HON).
 1973–74 — Champion with Motagua (HON).
 1974–75 — Runner-up with Motagua (HON).
 1975–76 — Champion with España (HON).
 1976–77 — Champion with España (HON).
 1977–78 — Runner-up with Real España (HON).
 1979–80 — Promotion with Atlético Morazán (HON).
 1981–82 — Runner-up with Atlético Morazán (HON).
 1982–83 — Runner-up with Motagua (HON).
 1986–87 — Promotion with Universidad (HON).
 1987–88 — Champion with Olimpia (HON).
 2003–04 — Promotion with Valencia (HON).

Personal life
Padilla is the grandfather of the footballer Luis Argeñal.

References

1934 births
2014 deaths
People from Valle Department
Honduran footballers
Honduran football managers
C.D. Águila managers
Honduras national football team managers
Real C.D. España managers
F.C. Motagua players
Platense F.C. managers
F.C. Motagua managers
C.D. Olimpia managers
C.D. Marathón managers

Association footballers not categorized by position